Wattwil railway station is a railway station in Wattwil, in the Swiss canton of St. Gallen. It is served by local and long-distance trains.

Services 

Three S-Bahn routes and one InterRegio long-distance service call at Wattwil railway station.

Trains 
 St. Gallen S-Bahn:
 : hourly service between Wattwil,  and Wattwil (circular operation, in both directions).

Bus 
There are several bus services departing from Wattwil railway station. The bus lines are as follows:

Gallery

References

External links 
 
 Wattwil station on SBB

Railway stations in the canton of St. Gallen
Südostbahn stations